is a Japanese manga series written and illustrated by Takatoshi Kumakura. The manga was first serialized in the Japanese seinen manga magazine Afternoon Season Zoukan in August 2000. The magazine was suspended after its 14th issue, and the manga continued its serialization from the March 2003 issue of Monthly Afternoon magazine. An anime adaptation by Madhouse and Tezuka Productions premiered on October 7, 2007 and ended on March 25, 2008.

Plot 
The series revolves around the Hibara sisters' encounters with Japanese demons and spirits. The older sister, Shizuru, has the ability to see these apparitions, while the younger sister, Mizuki, has a tendency to become possessed by them. They live in the countryside because their parents were unable to deal with their supernatural abilities; their grandfather is an expert in such affairs. Through their encounters with the supernatural, Mizuki and Shizuru learn about both themselves and the world at large.

Characters 

A girl who can see spirits.

Shizuru's younger sister. She is easily possessed by spirits.

Media

Manga

Anime 
An anime adaptation of Mokke, directed by Masayoshi Nishida and animated by Madhouse, was aired in Japan between October 2, 2007 and March 25, 2008 on Tokyo MX containing twenty-four episodes. The DVDs were released from January 25, 2008 to September 26, 2008.

Yoshihiro Ike was in charge of the music direction in the anime.  is sung by Riyu Kosaka as the opening theme. Its single was released on December 12, 2007 by avex trax.  is sung by Mai Hashimoto as the ending theme.

Reception

References

External links 
  Official Web Site
  Madhouse Site
 

Anime series
Kodansha manga
Madhouse (company)
Seinen manga
Tezuka Productions